Bebearia senegalensis, the Senegal palm forester, is a butterfly in the family Nymphalidae. It is found in Senegal, the Gambia, Guinea-Bissau, northern Guinea, northern Sierra Leone and northern Ivory Coast. The habitat consists of dry forests and Guinea savanna.

The larvae feed on Raphia palma-pinus.

References

Butterflies described in 1858
senegalensis